"Step into the Light" is an exclusively Japanese released single by Mexican-American singer, Myra. The song was written by Michelle Hart, Marc Hugenburger, and Catte Adams and included on the re-release of her album, Myra called Myra+more. It was also accompanied by a music video with Myra wearing similar garments in her previous single, "Lie, Lie, Lie." The single was remixed by Love to Infinity and was a commercial success within the nightclub and Harajuku scenes in Japan in 2002 after the success of her previous single, "Lie, Lie, Lie," and its accompanying remixes by Akira "Boss" Yokota for (Y&Co.), Selju Honmach from SCHWEITZER, and DJ akim for MISSION "B" productions, as well. The original mix produced by Michelle Hart and Marc Hugenburger for Sweethart Productions is featured on two editions of Avex 15th Anniversary Presents 15 Years 150 Hits compilation sets.

Track listing

Remixes 
The remixed version by Love to Infinity was released on a promotional vinyl single with its extended version on Side A and the radio mix on Side B. It is featured on two electronic dance music compilation sets by Avex Trax.

2002 singles
2001 songs
Avex Trax singles